Joseph Brotherton (22 May 1783 – 7 January 1857) was a reforming British politician, Nonconformist minister and pioneering vegetarian. He has been described as the first vegetarian member of parliament.

Biography 
He was born in Whittington, near Chesterfield, Derbyshire, and was the son of John Brotherton, an excise collector, and his wife Mary. In 1789 the family moved to Salford, Lancashire, where John Brotherton established a cotton and silk mill.

Joseph received no formal education, instead joining the family firm, of which he became a partner in 1802. On the death of his father in 1809 he went into partnership with his cousin William Harvey. In 1806 he married his business partner's sister, Martha Harvey (–1861).

Bible Christian Church
In 1805 he joined the Salford Swedenborgian Church. The church, led by William Cowherd, was renamed the Bible Christian Church in 1809. In 1816 Cowherd died, and Brotherton became a minister. The church required abstention from the eating of meat or drinking of alcohol. In 1812, his wife Martha authored Vegetable Cookery, the first vegetarian cookbook.

In 1819, aged only thirty-six, Brotherton retired from the family business in order to devote his energy to his ministry. He used his position to actively improve the conditions of workers and campaign for reforms. Among his achievements were the building of schools, the opening of a lending library and the establishment of a fund to support the victims of the Peterloo Massacre. He was a member of the Portico Library, an overseer of the poor and a justice of the peace.

Membership of the Little Circle

From 1815 Brotherton was a member of a group of Nonconformist Liberals, meeting in the Manchester home of John Potter, termed the Little Circle. Other members of the group included: John Edward Taylor (founder of The Manchester Guardian), Archibald Prentice (later editor of the Manchester Times), John Shuttleworth (industrialist and municipal reformer), Absalom Watkin (parliamentary reformer and anti corn law campaigner), William Cowdray Jnr (editor of the Manchester Gazette), Thomas Potter (later first mayor of Manchester) and Richard Potter (later MP for Wigan). In 1820 Brotherton, Shuttleworth and Thomas Potter founded the Manchester Chamber of Commerce.

In 1821, after the Peterloo Massacre and the government-led closure of the Manchester Observer, the group without Cowdroy backed John Edward Taylor in founding the Manchester Guardian newspaper.

After the death of John Potter, the Potter brothers formed a second Little Circle group, to begin a campaign for parliamentary reform. This called for the better proportional representation in the Houses of Parliament from the rotten boroughs towards the fast-growing industrialised towns of Birmingham, Leeds, Manchester and Salford. After the petition raised on behalf of the group by Absalom Watkin, Parliament passed the Reform Act 1832.

Salford's first member of parliament
The group's aims were achieved with the passing of the Reform Act 1832. Brotherton was elected as Salford's first Member of Parliament at the ensuing general election. He was re-elected five times, unopposed on two occasions. In parliament he campaigned against the death penalty, for the abolition of slavery and for free non-denominational education. He actively supported the Municipal Corporations Bill, which led to Manchester and Salford having democratically elected councils. He took an interest in the facilities provided by the new municipalities, and was largely responsible for the opening of Peel Park, Salford and Weaste Cemetery.

Death

Brotherton died suddenly from a heart attack aged 73 in January 1857, while travelling to a meeting in Manchester. He was buried on 14 January in the new Weaste municipal cemetery, Salford, the first interment at the cemetery he campaigned for, following a two and a half mile long funeral procession. A Joseph Brotherton Memorial Fund was established, and a statue of Brotherton was erected in Peel Park in 1858. The statue was dismantled in 1954 and sold into private ownership in 1969. At the time Salford City Council were looking for any additional revenue and it sold the statue to a scrap metal merchant. He was aware of the rivalry between the two cities so he approached Manchester with the suggestion they might buy it. It was purchased by Manchester City Council in 1986, and was resited at Riverside Walk, overlooking the River Irwell and facing towards Salford. The effect was that he was looking balefully at the city that thought so little of him as to sell his statue. It is currently being relocated onto the Salford bank of the Irwell to make way for a new footbridge linking Salford to the Spinningfield development.

References

External links 
 

1783 births
1857 deaths
British reformers
British vegetarianism activists
Christian vegetarianism
English Swedenborgians
Liberal Party (UK) MPs for English constituencies
Members of the Parliament of the United Kingdom for Salford
People from Old Whittington
People from Salford
UK MPs 1832–1835
UK MPs 1835–1837
UK MPs 1837–1841
UK MPs 1841–1847
UK MPs 1847–1852
UK MPs 1852–1857